Zinc finger MYM-type containing 1 is a protein that in humans is encoded by the ZMYM1 gene.

References

Further reading